This is a list of anime and manga according to the role harem plays in them.



Female harem as a central element
This list shows series in which interpersonal attraction between Female-centric harems and the gynephilic protagonist(s) – regardless of cited sex, gender, orientation, etc. – play a central role in their genre or storylines. Such elements are labeled by publishers as harem.

Male harem as a central element
This list shows series in which interpersonal attraction between Male-centric harems and the androphilic protagonist(s) – regardless of cited sex, gender, orientation, etc. – play a central role in their genre or storylines. Such elements are labeled by publishers as harem.

References

Lists of anime by genre
Lists of manga by genre
 List of